Why I Am a Vegetarian is an 1895 pamphlet based on an address delivered by J. Howard Moore before the Chicago Vegetarian Society. It was reprinted several times by the society and other publishers.

Background

John Howard Moore, born in Missouri in 1862, was an American writer, zoologist, and science teacher, and a prominent member in the Chicago Vegetarian Society.

Around 1886, Moore became a vegetarian for ethical reasons. He advocated for the ethical treatment of animals and authored several books, essays and pamphlets on the subject, as well as on the subjects of vegetarianism, evolutionary history, and humanitarianism.

Carrica Le Favre, a well-known health lecturer, dress reformer, child-rearing expert, and physical culture advocate, founded the Chicago Vegetarian Society around 1890, which Moore joined shortly thereafter, while in attendance of Chicago University. Moore earned a baccalaureate degree from Chicago University in zoology. While at the university, Moore was one of the founders of the Vegetarian Eating Club, which he eventually became the lead and front of.

Moore later wrote several well-regarded books, such as the 1906 work The Universal Kinship, the 1907 work The New Ethics, and the 1916 work Savage Survivals, among many other publications.

Addresses

Moore wrote the paper "Why I Am a Vegetarian" around the early part of 1895, which was primarily on the benefits of living on a vegetable diet, along with his opinions on the advances in the animal rights advocacy movement. He delivered an address with this paper, before the Chicago Vegetarian Society at the newly constructed Great Northern Hotel, on the northeast corner of Dearborn Street and Jackson Boulevard in Chicago, on March 3, 1895. Moore was persuaded to publish the paper, and it was printed shortly afterwards. The Chicago Vegetarian Society published the pamphlet Why I Am a Vegetarian, based on his speech, later that year. The preface is dated May 3, 1895. This publication was the first of Moore's.

Another address, after the printing of the pamphlet, was delivered by Moore around June 1896, at the Philosophic Club, in Englewood, Chicago. The lecture was reported, in the monthly Food, Home and Garden newsletter, as being well received by those in attendance, with a discussion that followed afterwards. On the reading, Dr. Viola H. Ludden wrote that "the paper was broad and most excellent; full of scientific suggestion and humane thought."

Moore continued to give addresses on the subject of vegetarianism and animal rights with the Chicago Vegetarian Society for the following two decades, until his death in 1916.

Publication

The brochure Why I Am a Vegetarian, subtitled An Address Delivered before the Chicago Vegetarian Society, was published by the Purdy Publishing Company, in Chicago, Illinois, in 1895. At 5.5 x 18 centimeters, the 44-page pamphlet is described as "explaining that vegetable food is far better for humanity in a truly healthful sense, [with] the plea [...] for the human practice of the Golden Rule towards the animals which we [...] kill for food," in an advertisement in the April 15, 1902 edition of The Vegetarian Magazine.  It was also published in the same year as a 42-page pamphlet, by The Ward Waugh Publishing Company, at 5496 Ellis avenue, as well as in the periodical Good Health. It also appeared in the September 1897 issue of Chicago Vegetarian.

An early edition of the publication was available for 10 cents. A 48-page third edition, printed in 1898, was sold for a cost of 25 cents per issue, or 5 copies for $1.00. It was advertised as having a fancy green cover, which was fastened with a silk cord, and as being "suitable for gifts." The publisher was the Eastman Kodak Company. By 1899, the publication had made its seventh thousandth print and was being sold in crepe paper, still for a cost of 25 cents. Why I Am a Vegetarian is held at university and public libraries in the United States.

A response to Moore's pamphlet, entitled Why I Am Not a Vegetarian: Why He is Wrong, was written by Danish-born American lawyer, lecturer, and political activist Laurence Gronlund. Moore later replied to Gronlund's writing, saying that for the carnivore, "every meal is a murder," and that to "tell why one is 'not a vegetarian' is to give justification, or to attempt to give justification, for being a predatory animal."

Content

The Journal of the American Medicine Association notes that the "booklet is of interest," by an author who is a "zoöphilist vegetarian [who] uses no scientific arguments in favor of his thesis."

The preface for Why I Am a Vegetarian begins with an analogy of mankind's succeeding generations, in that "the human race is like a snake—it sheds. Ever and anon, as the ages bloom, old forms of thought are superseded by intellectual bran-news." The following page, opposite the opening, are excerpts from several works, including the Irish novelist and poet Oliver Goldsmith's The Hermit, as well as an anonymous poem "What more advance can mortals make in sin?..." It also contains quotes from the British surgeon and polymath Sir Henry Thompson, the Scottish born geologist and natural scientist Richard Owen, and the Greek biographer and essayist Plutarch.

He opens with writing, earnestly, that he "hope[s] in half a hundred minutes to rinse from your brains sand bars that have been ages in depositing," in regards to a meat-eating diet. Moore then confounds that "human beings preach as the cardinal of morality that they should act upon others as they would be pleased to have others act upon them, and then take the most sensitive and beautiful beings all palpitating with life, and chop them into fragments with a composure that would do honor to the managers of an inferno." Moore asserts that the meat-eating habits of English and American peoples exist because their forefathers were cannibals.

Moore says that he is a vegetarian because he believes "that present-day ethics is founded on that puerile, pre-Darwinian delusion that all other kinds of creatures and all worlds were created explicitly for the hominine species. Vegetarianism is the ethical corollary of evolution [and] has taught us the kinship of all creatures." His concluding paragraph begins with "Enjoy and let others enjoy. Live and let live. Do more. Live and help live. [...] Pity the grub and the ladybug, and have mercy on the mole. Poor, defenceless, undeveloped, untaught creatures. They are our fellow mortals."

The last page of the pamphlet contains an advertisement for twenty publications by Frances L. Dusenberry, at the McVicker's Building, in Chicago.

Reception
The journal Boston Ideas writes that the brochure is "one of the most eloquent treatises on the subject that we have read," calling his language "vitally expressive [with] convincing sincerity." It concludes with writing that "vegetarianism is the coming practice for the intelligent and sincere, and its inroads are already more rapid than is generally realized." In their review of Why I Am a Vegetarian, the periodical The Public writes that it is "doubtless [to] question in some form [what] many persons who nevertheless go on eating what they do not hesitate to describe as 'corpses,'" noting that "we do kill men as well as animals; and, both having been killed, what difference is there between making food of one of the other?"

It is described by The Vegetarian as being "worth the savings of a lifetime to every human being who desires to be honest [and] it should be got out in cheaper form, printed by the million, and [have] a copy placed in the hands of every human being who can read English and translated for the benefit of those who cannot." The Pacific Health Journal writes that J. Howard Moore "portrays very vividly the relation which we as rational beings sustain to the whole animal creation, if we viewed it in a sensitive light, such as we would if we had never been educated to live upon flesh meats." A review in Good Health says that it is a "little booklet which every meat eater ought to read [and] it is difficult to see how any person possessed of a really human soul can look a cow or a sheep in the face without blushing, after reading this book."

A quote from Moore's brochure, that "vegetarianism is the ethical corollary of evolution [and] is simply the expansion of ethics to suit the biological revelations of Charles Darwin" appears in Adam D. Shprintzen's 2013 work, The Vegetarian Crusade: The Rise of an American Reform Movement 1817-1921, at the beginning of the sixth chapter. In addition to several other citations, the pamphlet has also been made available in eBook format by several digital publishing companies.

Criticism
[[File:WhyIAmAVegetarian-JAMA.jpg|thumb|right|Review in the left column, in the Journal of the American Medical Association]]
In a mixed review from the Journal of the American Medical Association, the reviewer writes that, as indicated in the pamphlet, vegetarianism is "being taken up with more vigor; its propaganda is more active than for some time past." However, on Moore's intolerance to meat-eating, they note the terms "Christian cannibals" and "ghoulish clowns of science" as examples of his utterances towards "those who disagree with his dietetic opinions."

The New Church Life newsletter describes Moore's writings as "vigorous, [yet] his argument is not convincing to a Newchurchman, although [it] contains statements which, in the minds of some, awaken scruples as to eating things slain."

References

Citations

Sources

External linksWhy I Am a Vegetarian'' at Internet Archive

1895 non-fiction books
Books about animal rights
Books about vegetarianism
Books by J. Howard Moore
English non-fiction books
Ethics books
Pamphlets
Vegetarian-related mass media